Faire: L'amour, also known as FLA, is a 2014 French drama film directed by Djinn Carrénard. It was the opening film of the International Critics' Week section at the 2014 Cannes Film Festival.

Cast
 Azu as Oussmane 
 Laurette Lalande as Laure 
 Maha as Kahina 
 Axel Philippon as Ramon

References

2014 films
2014 drama films
French drama films
2010s French-language films
2010s French films